Georgette Savvides (born February 10, 1973) is a Greek Egyptian psychologist and director of Psychealth. She has a double masters in Business psychology and Clinical psychology. Though she was born in Egypt, she comes from a Greek family background and was raised between the two countries. Her cross cultural experience has allowed her to obtain a curiosity in the field of psychology, where she has been investing her professional experience and exposure for the past twenty five years.  (1990-2015–present).

Education
In 2000, Savvides obtained her MSc. in Clinical and Public Health Aspects of Addiction from Kings College, Institute of Psychiatry National Addition Center, UK. She then received her professional Doctorate in Psychology with a specialization in Counseling Psychology from City University, UK. She also acquired a Level A & B Competence Certificate in Occupational and Organizational consultancy and Psychometric Testing from City University, UK. Later, in 2012, she got her second doctorate from Southern California University in the US, with a specialization in Occupational/Business psychology.

Career
Savvides started her psychology training in 1990 and has been working in the field ever since. Acquiring experience, training and research from several institutions in the UK, Greece and Egypt, Savvides worked across a realm of psychological conditions; ranging in severity and nature of cases, using the most updated methods of Cognitive Behavioural Therapy. She has extensive experience in dealing with drugs and alcohol abuse, behavioral and psychiatric disorders, eating disorders, family and couple counseling. She has also been lecturing and providing post graduate training, workshops, presentations; as well as supervision to post graduate students.

In 2005, Savvides rejoined Behman Hospital as the Head of Psychological Services and also worked in the educational sectors heading the department of Psychology in Business College of Athens (BCA) in Greece and has taught psychology at the American University in Cairo (AUC).

She has opened her own practice in 2009, where she sees clients individually using a CBT approach and directing the training department; offering educational programs in counseling, as well as practicing occupational psychology in several projects with leading corporate sectors; handling recruitment, team building, capacity building, training and consultancy amongst other relevant topics.

Professional membership and registration
 1999 The British Psychological Society
 2002 CCC REG. National Register of UK Counsellors                                
 NHS National Independent Provider Code
 2002 British Association For Counselling and Psychotherapy
 2003 Eating Disorder Association
 2003  National Center of Eating Disorders
 2003 British Association of Behavioural and Cognitive Psychotherapy

References

1973 births
Living people
Egyptian psychologists
Greek psychologists
Egyptian women psychologists
Greek women psychologists
People from Cairo